This glossary of nanotechnology is a list of definitions of terms and concepts relevant to nanotechnology, its sub-disciplines, and related fields.

For more inclusive glossaries concerning related fields of science and technology, see Glossary of chemistry terms, Glossary of physics, Glossary of biology, and Glossary of engineering.

A

B

C

D

E

F

G

H

I

K

L

M

N

P

Q

R

S

T

U

V

W

Z

See also
Outline of nanotechnology
Glossary of physics
Glossary of areas of mathematics
Glossary of astronomy
Glossary of biology
Glossary of calculus
Glossary of chemistry terms
Glossary of engineering
Glossary of probability and statistics

External links
Nanotechnology Glossary
Glossary | Nano - Nano.gov
Nanotechnology Glossary of Terminology | Cheap Tubes
Glossary | International Institute for Nanotechnology
Glossary of Nanotechnology Terms

Nanotechnology
Nanotechnology
Technology-related lists
Wikipedia glossaries using description lists